The 2019–20 season was Gaziantep F.K.'s 32nd year in existence. In addition to the domestic league, Gaziantep F.K. participated in the Turkish Cup.

Squad

Süper Lig

League table

Results summary

Results by round

Matches

Türkiye Kupası

Fifth round

References

Gaziantep F.K. seasons
Turkish football clubs 2019–20 season